Stephen L. Johnson (born November 13, 1939) is an American lawyer and politician who served as a member of the Washington State Senate, representing the 47th district from 1995 to 2007. A member of the Republican Party, he ran for the Washington Supreme Court in 2006, losing to incumbent Susan Owens.

References

Living people
Republican Party Washington (state) state senators
1939 births
American lawyers